Compression is the first solo album by bassist Billy Sheehan, formerly of Talas, David Lee Roth, and Mr. Big.

Track listing
All tracks by Billy Sheehan

"Bleed Along the Way" – 3:55
"Oblivion" – 4:29
"Somethin's Gotta Give" – 4:23
"What Once Was..." – 4:09
"Chameleon" – 4:06
"Perfect Groove" – 5:37
"One Good Reason" – 3:02
"Three Days Blind" – 4:22
"Caroline" – 4:48
"All Mixed Up" – 4:06
"Feed Your Head" – 4:30

Personnel
Billy Sheehan - bass guitar, ultra bass, vocals, baritone 6 and 12 string electric guitars, drum programming
Simone Sello - keyboards, drum programming, sampling
Steve Vai - guitar solo on track 5
Terry Bozzio - drums on tracks 1 and 2

Notes

Chameleon is played on the Steve Vai DVD Live at the Astoria.

Billy Sheehan albums
2001 albums
Favored Nations albums